Taylorella asinigenitalis is a Gram-negative, catalase- and oxidase-positive,  nonmotile bacterium of the genus Taylorella, isolated from the genital tract of male donkeys (Equus asinus) in California.

References

External links
Type strain of Taylorella asinigenitalis at BacDive -  the Bacterial Diversity Metadatabase

Burkholderiales
Bacteria described in 1984